Dixie E. Toelkes (August 4, 1935–June 30, 2015) was an American politician who served as a Democratic member of the Kansas House of Representatives from 1995 to 2002. She represented the 53rd District and lived in Topeka, Kansas. 

Toelkes worked as a special education teacher. She was first elected in 1994 and took office in 1995. She served until 2002, when health problems led to her retirement; her husband, Roger, was appointed to fill her seat and was re-elected to one term in his own right.

References

1935 births
2015 deaths
Democratic Party members of the Kansas House of Representatives
20th-century American politicians
21st-century American politicians
20th-century American women politicians
21st-century American women politicians
Women state legislators in Kansas
Politicians from Topeka, Kansas
Kansas State University alumni